Ran Sayura is a 2017 Sri Lankan action film  directed by Sudesh Wasantha Pieris and produced by J.H. Wasantha Kumara and S.A. Sanjeewa Kumara under their Mahee Tharu Films banner. The film features Wasantha Kumaravila and Roger Seneviratne as the leading actors and Himali Siriwardena as the leading actress. The film was released on 16 February 2017 in Sri Lanka. It is the 1269th Sri Lankan film in the Sinhala cinema.

Cast
 Wasantha Kumaravila as Michael
 Roger Seneviratne as OIC
 Himali Siriwardena as Maari
 Susila Kottage as Katherina
 Ruwangi Rathnayake as Nirasha
 Mahinda Pathirage as Robert
 Wishwa Lanka as Suren
 Rangana Premaratne as Anton
 Premadasa Vithanage as Liyana Mahaththaya
 Hemantha Iriyagama as Constable 
 Jeevan Handunetti as Gunda
 Isuru Lokuhettiarachchi as Punchi Baby
 Sanjeewani Weerasinghe as Maari's mother
 Sinethi Akila as Sandali

Production Team
Art Direction - Sarath Samara Wickrama
Colour Designer - Ananda Bandara
Sound Design - Sashika Ruwan
Visual Effects - Chaminda Lakmal
Director of Photography - Gamini Moragollagama
Stunt Director - Wasantha Kumaravila

Soundtrack

References

Sri Lankan drama films
2010s Sinhala-language films